Somula mississippiensis is a species of syrphid fly in the family Syrphidae.

Distribution
United States.

References

Eristalinae
Insects described in 1922
Diptera of North America
Hoverflies of North America
Taxa named by Frank Montgomery Hull